The Kowloon-Canton Railway class of ex-WD Austerity 2-8-0 was a class of 12 steam locomotives, ex-WD Austerity 2-8-0. Unlike other KCR locomotives, they apparently did not receive a class letter designation.

At the end of the war several WD Austerity 2-8-0s were in store at the Longmoor Military Railway and 12 were bought by the Crown Agents. They were overhauled at Royal Woolwich Arsenal and despatched from Tilbury and King George V Docks in 1946 and 1947 as shipping became available.

In Hong Kong, the livery was green with red buffer beam and 2-8-0 type wheels, white smokebox doors, numbers on cabsides and tender sides.

Nos 21-5 were converted to oil firing. Hulson grates were fitted to the remainder. 25 was later converted back to coal firing. They were replaced by diesels and fell out of use before withdrawal. All were scrapped. The last loco to run in service was 26 on September 2 1962

22 was destroyed on April 27 1956. The firebox crown collapsed leading to an explosion which killed six people

Details were as follows:

References 
 

Steam locomotives of Hong Kong
Steam locomotives of China
Standard gauge locomotives of Hong Kong
Standard gauge locomotives of China
2-8-0 locomotives
Railway locomotives introduced in 1946
Scrapped locomotives